The plaza de la Villa is an urban square in central Madrid, Spain. The square, bordering the Calle Mayor, houses some of the oldest buildings still around in the city.

History and description 
It lies in the Palacio neighborhood, part of the Centro District.

It was known as "Plaza de San Salvador" in ancient times, as it was located near the (now defunct) Church of San Salvador, in whose atrium the primitive municipal council convened (the church was demolished in 1842). In 1463 Henry IV of Castile granted a market day in the square on Tuesdays. The Casa de los Lujanes (with its adjacent tower), dated from the 15th-century, is the oldest civil building in Madrid. The tradition states the tower was the location where Francis I of France was held captive after his capture in the 1525 Battle of Pavia.

Other buildings in the square are the 16th-century Casa de Cisneros and the old city hall, the Casa de la Villa de Madrid. The primitive  (or Fuente de la Villa), located in the centre of the square, also disappeared.

In 1888, a statue of Álvaro de Bazán by sculptor Mariano Benlliure was commissioned for the 300th anniversary of his death; the square was chosen as location both because of its centrality and because of its small size the sculpture would stand out the most; the  inauguration took place on 19 December 1891.

References 
Citations

Bibliography 
 
 
 
 

Villa